George F. Bryant  (February 10, 1857 – June 12, 1907)  was a Major League Baseball second baseman. He played in one game on August 6, 1885 for the Detroit Wolverines and failed to record a hit in four at-bats.

Sources

Major League Baseball second basemen
Detroit Wolverines players
Baseball players from Connecticut
1857 births
1907 deaths
Salem Witches players
Sportspeople from Bridgeport, Connecticut
19th-century baseball players